Castle Grant platform railway station was a railway station serving Castle Grant, in Strathspey in Scotland.

History 
This station was opened with the Inverness and Perth Junction Railway in 1863. The station closed in 1949, the line closing in 1965.

Location 
This was a private halt located at the overbridge and lodge at the gatehouse of Castle Grant.  The overbridge is where the railway crosses the A939 road north of Grantown-on-Spey
 '...in acknowledgement of the great facilities given by the Earl of Seafield in the formation of the railway through his estates'

Remains 
Some concrete platform stumps remain along the trackbed (in various states) near the lodge.

References

Sources 
 Historic Scotland - mentions Castle Grant halt.

Disused railway stations in Highland (council area)
Railway stations in Great Britain opened in 1863
Former private railway stations